Gëzim Morina (born 12 December 1992) is a Kosovan-Albanian professional basketball player for KB Ylli of the Kosovo Basketball Superleague.
Gezim Morina and his friend Erjon Kastrati made history by helping KB Ylli to win Liga Unike and Kosovo Basketball Superleague for the first time in history of the club.
 He grew up with Union Olimpija (Slovenia) juniors. Morina signed for the 2011–12 season with Mercator Skofja Loka. Also on December 11 he signed with Union Olimpija club. Morina played in the 2011 Slovenian All Star Game. Also he has been member of the Slovenian U-20 National Team.

Professional career
In 2009 he joined with Erjon Kastrati Union Olipija youth system. In 2010–11 season Morina was loaned KK Skofja Loka in  Slovenian First Division, where he averaged with 8.5 points, 4.1 rebounds and 0.4 blocks per game in 20 games played. In summer 2014 he signed with KK Maribor, but financial trouble Morina joined Helios Suns, where he averaged with 9.1 points, 5.4 rebounds and 1.1 assists per game in 19 games played.

In August 2015, Morina signed with KB Sigal Prishtina. With Sigal he played in regional (Balkan League) and FIBA Europe Cup. In February 2016 he helped win Kosovar Cup.

On February 24, 2016, he signed with KK Škofja Loka.

Morina spent the 2019–20 season with Slovenian side Hopsi Polzela, where he averaged 11.7 points and 6.1 rebounds per game. On July 14, 2020, he has signed with Helios Suns of the Slovenian League.

International career

Slovenia 
Morina played with Slovenia U20 in 2012 FIBA Europe Under-20 Championship and where he averaged with 7.5 points, 4.1 rebounds and 0.4 assists per game in 9 games played.

On 31 August 2016. Morina made his debut for Slovenia at the EuroBasket 2017 qualification match against Kosovo.

Kosovo 
On 21 June 2017. Erolld Belegu, the president of Basketball Federation of Kosovo confirmed that Morina together with Erjon Kastrati will be part of Kosovo.

References

External links
 Gezim Morina  at fiba.com
 Gezim Morina  at Euroleague.com
 Gezim Morina  at Fibaeurope.com

1992 births
Living people
Centers (basketball)
KB Prishtina players
KK Olimpija players
Kosovan men's basketball players
Kosovo Albanians
People from Suva Reka
Power forwards (basketball)
Slovenian men's basketball players
Slovenian people of Albanian descent
Slovenian people of Kosovan descent
Yugoslav people of Albanian descent
KB Ylli players
Helios Suns players